Podbreg is a small settlement in the upper Vipava Valley, next to Podnanos, in the Municipality of Vipava in the Littoral region of Slovenia.

References

External links

Podbreg at Geopedia

Populated places in the Municipality of Vipava